Legislative elections were held in Mongolia on 27 June 2004. The Mongolian People's Revolutionary Party remained the largest party in the State Great Khural, winning 36 of the 76 seats. On 27 February 2005 a by-election was held in the 59th constituency and was won by the MPRP, giving them an extra seat.

Results

References

Elections in Mongolia
Mongolia
State Great Khural
Election and referendum articles with incomplete results